The 1978 Agoura-Malibu firestorm was a firestorm fueled by at least eight significant wildfires in the Los Angeles area on October 23, 1978. At around noon that day, an arsonist started a fire that eventually burned  from Cornell to Broad Beach in Malibu. It had been declared a Level 2 (maximum emergency) fire at 1:57 PM.

As the fires spread through the canyons of the Santa Monica Mountains over the next four days, a total of 230 homes were destroyed in Agoura and Malibu, and in the Los Angeles community of Mandeville Canyon to the east.  At least 254 other structures were also destroyed.  The fire was contained on October 25 and controlled on October 27. 136 engine companies, 28 camp crews, 8 bulldozers, 6  helicopters and 6 fixed wing air tankers helped fight this fire.

Residents of Agoura evacuated to a shopping center next to the Ventura Freeway in Agoura Hills, where massive flames could be seen engulfing Castro Peak. Damage caused by the group of fires burning was estimated at 71.4 million, according to California officials. Three people were killed and 50 were injured, according to the Los Angeles Fire Department. A 15-year-old Agoura youth was arrested for starting the fire, and sentenced to be confined in the California Youth Authority until his 21st birthday. Arson investigators determined that he had used a lit cigarette wrapped in a matchbook to set the fire.

This was the largest of several fires set over the period of a week in the Agoura area.

Mandeville Canyon Fire 
The Mandeville Canyon Fire began in arid Southern California and caused considerable harm to its citizens and infrastructure––resulting in over 200 destroyed homes and 3 fatalities as the fire burned through about 38,000 acres of land. On Monday, October 23 at 9:41 a.m., an uncontrolled brush fire in the Mulholland Drive region developed rapidly, and emergency officials declared a major emergency within about an hour after the initial report.

Fire situation 
Various other blazes in Southern California accompanied this initial outbreak, heavily slowing down the LAFD's suppression efforts as it stretched across five days. Beginning what is now known as the Agoura-Malibu fires, another brush fire began in the Elsinore–Perris region and erupted into a series of seven brush fires in the span of six hours. This rapid development of fires––along with the initial Mulholland Drive fire––largely occurred because of the Santa Ana winds, an exacerbating force in the realm of wildfires. The winds peak in the cooler fall and spring seasons, where hot air encounters high pressure in the dry southwest and travels westward into the Southern California coast––blowing at a rate of about forty miles per hour. As the Southern California area simultaneously saw a buildup of dry timber, known as fuels, while entering a dry and windy season, the development of wildfires was imminent. Once the fuels caught fire, the dry, downslope Santa Ana winds fanned the flames as they grew at an exponentially fast rate, culminating in a series of wildfires throughout the region.

Fire Department response 
The Los Angeles County Fire Department dispatched 300 firefighters to manage the Mandeville County blaze, and ultimately faced a personnel shortage in the process. Off-duty officers in the region thus served as a supplementary addition to the fire-fighting effort. This labor shortage likely occurred due to the fire department’s simultaneous response to the more powerful Malibu fires, for around 500 firefighters were sent to the Agoura-Malibu region where the wildfire had stretched toward the ocean for about 20 miles.

As the brush fires in Mandeville County grew powerful enough to prompt an emergency response, Battalion Chief Gary Henery ordered what is known as a “full response” to manage the nearby conflagration, sending, “five engines, four camp crews, two helicopters, two patrol trucks, and two tractors". This circumstance called for a swift response, and––within minutes––Chief Henrey also called for tanker planes and additional engines to manage the fire’s challenging pace. Burning through about 23,000 acres of land, the Mandeville fire moved rapidly and would reach the Pacific Coast Highway in a matter of two hours––traveling a distance of about 36 miles. Additionally, the scramble for residents in the area to evacuate proved to complicate the fire-fighting effort, as many firemen reported that crowds of inhabitants and curious spectators swarmed the areas of greatest concern. Sunset Boulevard also became congested with traffic, serving as a potential hazard as emergency vehicles entered the scene.

Results 
Weather conditions improved the following day, October 24th, with lower temperatures and fog beginning to develop. The crew thus worked under a more favorable climate, and by 7 a.m. on Wednesday, October 25th, the LAFD announced full containment of the wildfire––where the crew succeeded in creating a “fire break” by digging around the fire’s perimeter. It was extensively under control, or fully extinguished, by Friday.

Community reaction 
According to Mandeville County residents, the LAFD took a dangerously prolonged approach to managing the initial brush fires, witnesses citing a lack of manpower, and many emergency officials admitted that their resources were simply too limited to offer a more rapid response; for instance, Chief England recalled that “When we saw the speed it was moving, we tried to release equipment, but we were spread too thin”. As the fire continued to burn on October 25th, fire officials thus criticized their city government for issuing personnel cutbacks through Proposition 13––an initiative which limited property taxes through the reallocation of funds from emergency services––claiming that the LAFD’s delayed response could be attributed to their shortage of manpower.

This statement would cause controversy in political spheres; for instance, LA councilman Marvin Braude, who was present at the scene of the Mandeville Canyon fire, stated that the fire department’s requests for units and gear were promptly fulfilled without shortages. Braude served on the City Council’s Finance Committee and had a hand in passing Proposition 13. Apart from an explicit conflict of interest, it is difficult to discern whether a councilman has the authority to judge an adequate fire-fighting response, particularly when many officials were primarily concerned with staff rather than resources. While the city did not amend Proposition 13 to offer greater support to fire departments, they were legally obligated to compensate property owners for the wildfire’s damage. As the Santa Ana winds prompted the city’s power lines to drop and spark the initial brush fires, they were held liable and eventually paid $8.5 million to twenty- two Mandeville residents and eight insurance companies.

References

Wildfires in Los Angeles County, California
1970s wildfires in the United States
1978 in Los Angeles
Santa Monica Mountains
Agoura Hills, California
Malibu, California
1978 crimes in the United States
1978 murders in the United States
1978 natural disasters in the United States
October 1978 events in the United States
1978 fires in the United States
California wildfires caused by arson